Mesosa myops is a species of beetle in the family Cerambycidae. It was described by Dalman in 1817, originally under the genus Cerambyx. It is known from Russia, China, Finland, Japan, Kazakhstan, Lithuania, Latvia, Belarus, Mongolia, North Korea, South Korea, Poland, Taiwan, and Ukraine.

Subspecies
 Mesosa myops japonica Bates, 1873
 Mesosa myops myops (Dalman, 1817)
 Mesosa myops plotina Wang, 2003

References

myops
Beetles described in 1817